In mathematics, Schur polynomials, named after Issai Schur, are certain symmetric polynomials in n variables, indexed by partitions, that generalize the elementary symmetric polynomials and the complete homogeneous symmetric polynomials.  In representation theory  they are the characters of polynomial irreducible representations of the general linear groups. The Schur polynomials form a linear basis for the space of all symmetric polynomials.  Any product of Schur polynomials can be written as a linear combination of Schur polynomials with non-negative integral coefficients; the values of these coefficients is given combinatorially by the Littlewood–Richardson rule. More generally, skew Schur polynomials  are associated with pairs of partitions and have similar properties to Schur polynomials.

Definition (Jacobi's bialternant formula) 

Schur polynomials are indexed by integer partitions.  Given a partition ,
where , and each  is a non-negative integer, the functions

are alternating polynomials by properties of the determinant. A polynomial is alternating if it changes sign under any transposition of the variables.

Since they are alternating, they are all divisible by the Vandermonde determinant

The Schur polynomials are defined as the ratio

This is known as the bialternant formula of Jacobi. It is a special case of the Weyl character formula.

This is a symmetric function because the numerator and denominator are both alternating, and a polynomial since all alternating polynomials are divisible by the Vandermonde determinant.

Properties

The degree  Schur polynomials in  variables are a linear basis for the space of homogeneous degree  symmetric polynomials in  variables. 
For a partition , the Schur polynomial is a sum of monomials,

where the summation is over all semistandard Young tableaux  of shape . This can be shown to be equivalent to the definition from the first Giambelli formula using the Lindström–Gessel–Viennot lemma (as outlined on that page).

Schur polynomials can be expressed as linear combinations of monomial symmetric functions  with non-negative integer coefficients  called Kostka numbers,

 

The Kostka numbers  are given by the number of semi-standard Young tableaux of shape λ and weight μ.

Jacobi−Trudi identities

The first Jacobi−Trudi formula expresses the Schur polynomial as a determinant
in terms of the complete homogeneous symmetric polynomials,

where .
 
The second Jacobi-Trudi formula expresses the Schur polynomial as 
a determinant in terms of the elementary symmetric polynomials,

where 

In both identities, functions with negative subscripts are defined to be zero.

The Giambelli identity

Another determinantal identity is Giambelli's formula, which expresses the Schur function for an arbitrary partition in terms of those for the hook partitions contained within the Young diagram. In Frobenius' notation, the partition is denoted 

where, for each diagonal element in position ,  denotes the number of boxes to the right in the same row and  denotes the number of boxes beneath it in the same column (the arm and leg lengths, respectively).

The Giambelli identity expresses the Schur function corresponding to this partition as the determinant

of those for hook partitions.

The Cauchy identity

The Cauchy identity for Schur functions (now in infinitely many variables), and its dual state that

and

If the sum is taken over products of Schur polynomials in  variables , the sum includes only partitions of length  since otherwise the Schur polynomials vanish.

There are many generalizations of these identities to other families of symmetric functions. 
For example, Macdonald polynomials, Schubert polynomials and Grothendieck polynomials admit Cauchy-like identities.

Further identities

The Schur polynomial can also be computed via a specialization of a formula for Hall–Littlewood polynomials,

where  is the subgroup of permutations such that 
for all i, and w acts on variables by permuting indices.

The Murnaghan−Nakayama rule

The Murnaghan–Nakayama rule expresses a product of a power-sum symmetric function with a Schur polynomial, in terms of Schur polynomials:

where the sum is over all partitions μ such that μ/λ is a rim-hook of size r and ht(μ/λ) is the number of rows in the diagram μ/λ.

The Littlewood–Richardson rule and Pieri's formula

The Littlewood–Richardson rule states that  is equal to the number of Littlewood–Richardson tableaux of skew shape  and of weight .

Pieri's formula is a special case of the Littlewood-Richardson rule, which expresses the product  in terms of Schur polynomials. The dual version expresses   in terms of Schur polynomials.

Specializations

One can show, by using the Weyl character formula for example, that

In this formula, the tuple indicating the width of each row of the Young diagram, is implicitly extended with zeros until it has length .
See also the Hook length formula which computes the same quantity for fixed λ.

Example
The following extended example should help clarify these ideas.  Consider the case n = 3, d = 4.  Using Ferrers diagrams or some other method, we find that there are just four partitions of 4 into at most three parts.  We have

and so on, where  is the Vandermonde determinant .  Summarizing:

Every homogeneous degree-four symmetric polynomial in three variables can be expressed as a unique linear combination of these four Schur polynomials, and this combination can again be found using a Gröbner basis for an appropriate elimination order.  For example,

is obviously a symmetric polynomial which is homogeneous of degree four, and we have

Relation to representation theory

The Schur polynomials occur in the representation theory of the symmetric groups, general linear groups, and unitary groups.  The Weyl character formula implies that the Schur polynomials are the characters of finite-dimensional irreducible representations of the general linear groups, and helps to generalize Schur's work to other compact and semisimple Lie groups.

Several expressions arise for this relation, one of the most important being the expansion of the Schur functions sλ in terms of the symmetric power functions . If we write χ for the character of the representation of the symmetric group indexed by the partition λ evaluated at elements of cycle type indexed by the partition ρ, then 

where ρ = (1r1, 2r2, 3r3, ...) means that the partition ρ has rk parts of length k.

A proof of this can be found in R. Stanley's Enumerative Combinatorics Volume 2, Corollary 7.17.5.

The integers χ can be computed using the Murnaghan–Nakayama rule.

Schur positivity

Due to the connection with representation theory, a symmetric function which expands positively in Schur functions are of 
particular interest. For example, the skew Schur functions expand positively in the ordinary Schur functions,
and the coefficients are Littlewood–Richardson coefficients.

A special case of this is the expansion of the complete homogeneous symmetric functions hλ in Schur functions.
This decomposition reflects how a permutation module is decomposed into irreducible representations.

Methods for proving Schur positivity

There are several approaches to prove Schur positivity of a given symmetric function F.
If F is described in a combinatorial manner, a direct approach is to produce a bijection with semi-standard Young tableaux.
The Edelman–Greene correspondence and the Robinson–Schensted–Knuth correspondence are examples of such bijections.

A bijection with more structure is a proof using so called crystals. This method can be described as defining a certain graph structure described with local rules on the underlying combinatorial objects.

A similar idea is the notion of dual equivalence. This approach also uses a graph structure, but on the objects representing the expansion in the fundamental quasisymmetric basis. It is closely related to the RSK-correspondence.

Generalizations

Skew Schur functions

Skew Schur functions sλ/μ depend on two partitions λ and μ, and can be defined by the property

Here, the inner product is the Hall inner product, for which the Schur polynomials form an orthonormal basis.

Similar to the ordinary Schur polynomials, there are numerous ways to compute these. The corresponding Jacobi-Trudi identities are

There is also a combinatorial interpretation of the skew Schur polynomials,
namely it is a sum over all semi-standard Young tableaux (or column-strict tableaux) of the skew shape .

The skew Schur polynomials expands positively in Schur polynomials. A rule for the coefficients is 
given by the Littlewood-Richardson rule.

Double Schur polynomials 

The double Schur polynomials can be seen as a generalization of the shifted Schur polynomials. 
These polynomials are also closely related to the factorial Schur polynomials.
Given a partition , and a sequence 
one can define the double Schur polynomial  as

where the sum is taken over all reverse semi-standard Young tableaux  of shape , and integer entries

A combinatorial rule for the Littlewood-Richardson coefficients (depending on the sequence a) was given by A.I Molev. In particular, this implies that the shifted Schur polynomials have non-negative Littlewood-Richardson coefficients.

The double Schur polynomials are special cases of the double Schubert polynomials.

Factorial Schur polynomials 

The factorial Schur polynomials may be defined as follows.
Given a partition λ, and a doubly infinite sequence …,a−1, a0, a1, …
one can define the factorial Schur polynomial sλ(x|a) as

where the sum is taken over all semi-standard Young tableaux T of shape λ, and integer entries
in 1, …, n.  Here T(α) denotes the value in the box α in T and c(α) is the content
of the box.

There is also a determinant formula,

where (y|a)k = (y − a1) ... (y − ak). It is clear that if we let  for all i,
we recover the usual Schur polynomial sλ.

The double Schur polynomials and the factorial Schur polynomials in n variables are related via the identity 
sλ(x||a)  = sλ(x|u) where an−i+1 = ui.

Other generalizations

There are numerous generalizations of Schur polynomials:

 Hall–Littlewood polynomials
 Shifted Schur polynomials
 Flagged Schur polynomials
 Schubert polynomials
 Stanley symmetric functions (also known as stable Schubert polynomials)
 Key polynomials (also known as Demazure characters)
 Quasi-symmetric Schur polynomials
 Row-strict Schur polynomials
 Jack polynomials
 Modular Schur polynomials
 Loop Schur functions
 Macdonald polynomials
 Schur polynomials for the symplectic and orthogonal group.
 k-Schur functions
 Grothendieck polynomials (K-theoretical analogue of Schur polynomials)
 LLT polynomials

See also

Schur functor
Littlewood–Richardson rule, where one finds some identities involving Schur polynomials.

References

Homogeneous polynomials
Invariant theory
Representation theory of finite groups
Symmetric functions
Orthogonal polynomials